Fukutani Tameike Dam is an earthfill dam located in Yamaguchi prefecture in Japan. The dam is used for irrigation. The catchment area of the dam is 2 km2. The dam impounds about 4  ha of land when full and can store 260 thousand cubic meters of water.

References

Dams in Yamaguchi Prefecture
1926 establishments in Japan